The Sevnica–Trebnje Railway is one of the railway lines that form the Slovenian Railway Network. It is located in Lower Carniola, the traditional region of southeastern Slovenia. It is used by both passenger and freight trains.

Course
The line crosses the Sava River and enters the Mirna Valley, where it then crosses the Mirna and the Bistrica rivers. It runs through the settlements of Dolenji Boštanj, Tržišče, Pijavice, Slovenska Vas, and Mirna. The largest structure on the line is the  Sava River bridge at Sevnica, built in 1938.

History
The prime reason for the line was the coal mine in Krmelj. The section between Trebnje and Krmelj was built in 1908. Between 1936 and 1938 the route was extended from Tržišče to Sevnica. The mine was closed in 1962 and the track removed in 1996, while the line from Sevnica to Trebnje through Tržišče has remained open.

References

Sources 
 Rustja, Karol. Dolenjske proge. (in Slovene) Tiri in čas, 6. Slovenske železnice - Železniški muzej. Ljubljana, 1994. .

External links 

Railway lines in Slovenia
Mirna Valley
Railway lines opened in 1938